In mathematics, Hasse invariant may refer to:

Hasse invariant of an algebra
Hasse invariant of an elliptic curve
Hasse invariant of a quadratic form